The following people were born in, or lived in Visalia, California.

Donald Blessing - gold medal-winning rower and former owner of Oakland Raiders football team
Tex Clevenger - professional baseball player
Tonya Cooley - reality television performer
Shane Costa - professional baseball player
Kevin Costner - actor and Oscar-winning director
Tom B. Coughran - banker, soldier, and public servant
 Christopher "Chris" Evans (1847-1917) - outlaw who lived in Visalia prior to his arrest for train robbery and confinement to Folsom Prison
Larry French - baseball player
Cody Gibson - professional mixed martial artist competing in the Ultimate Fighting Championship organization
Jerry Heard - professional golfer
Aaron Hill - professional baseball player
Tom Johnston - rock musician, singer, founding member of the Doobie Brothers
Avi Kaplan - singer and songwriter, former and founding member of Pentatonix
William Kettner - San Diego politician for whom Kettner Boulevard is named
Mike LaCoss - professional baseball player
Robert B. Laughlin - Nobel Prize-winning physicist
DJ Lemahieu - professional baseball player
Doug Marshall - mixed martial artist
Monte Melkonian - Armenian military leader in the Nagorno-Karabakh War
Beau Mills - professional baseball player
Don Mosebar - professional football player
Rance Mulliniks - MLB player for the California Angels, Kansas City Royals, and Toronto Blue Jays
Bob Ojeda - professional baseball player
Marty Perez - professional baseball player
Steve Perry - lead singer for the rock group Journey
Shirley Shahan  - retired NHRA Super Stock drag racer, nicknamed "Drag-On Lady"
Jean Shepard - country music singer
J. Curtis Struble - U.S. diplomat, ambassador to Peru
Bob Talbot - Baseball player 
Andrew Toti - inventor
Stephen Vogt - MLB player for the San Francisco Giants
Jim Wohlford - MLB player for the Kansas City Royals, Milwaukee Brewers, San Francisco Giants, and the Montreal Expos
Betsy Wolfe - actress, singer and Broadway performer
Edmond Edward Wysinger - Visalia pioneer (1862)
Tyler Zeller - NBA player for the Brooklyn Nets
Liza Soberano - actress

People from Visalia, California